Goran Adamović (born 24 April 1987) is a Serbian footballer who last played as a defender.

Playing career

Club
Born in Valjevo, SR Serbia, spent his youth career in Red Star Belgrade and FK Partizan. He made his senior debut in 2004 for FK BSK Borča in the Serbian League Belgrade. He joined Red Star on 16 January 2006. The following year, he won the league as well as the Serbian Cup. During the second half of the 2006–07 season, however, he was loaned to FK Zemun.

In summer 2008, he left Red Star and joined FK Novi Sad in the Serbian First League. In January 2009, he moved to Montenegrin club FK Budućnost Podgorica. With Budućnost, he was twice runner-up for the Montenegrin First League title as well as a finalist for the 2009–10 Montenegrin Cup. In summer 2012, he returned to Serbia and joined FK Spartak Subotica.

International
In 2005, he was part of the Serbia and Montenegro U19 team.

Managerial career
He was appointed manager of Maltese second tier-side Mqabba after retiring as a player.

References

External links
 Stats from Montenegro at FSCG.co.me
 Player profile at FK Budućnost Podgorica official website
 

1987 births
Living people
Sportspeople from Valjevo
Serbian footballers
Association football central defenders
FK BSK Borča players
Red Star Belgrade footballers
FK Zemun players
RFK Novi Sad 1921 players
FK Budućnost Podgorica players
FK Spartak Subotica players
MFK Ružomberok players
Serbian SuperLiga players
Slovak Super Liga players
Expatriate footballers in Slovakia
Serbian expatriate sportspeople in Slovakia
Serbian expatriate sportspeople in Malta
Serbian expatriate sportspeople in Montenegro
Mqabba F.C. players
Maltese Premier League players
Sliema Wanderers F.C. players
Expatriate footballers in Malta
Expatriate footballers in Montenegro